René Olmeta (10 June 1934 – 10 March 2023) was a French politician of the Socialist Party (PS).

Biography
Born in Marseille on 10 June 1934, Olmeta was a part of the Grand Orient de France. He held various mandates at the local, departmental, and national level. Most notably, he served as a deputy of the National Assembly from Bouches-du-Rhône's 5th constituency, serving from 1981 to 1986.

Olmeta died in Marseille on 10 March 2023, at the age of 88.

References

1934 births
2023 deaths
Socialist Party (France) politicians
Deputies of the 7th National Assembly of the French Fifth Republic
Politicians from Marseille